Minuscule 715 (in the Gregory-Aland numbering), ε364 (von Soden), is a Greek minuscule manuscript of the New Testament, on parchment. Palaeographically it has been assigned to the 13th century. The manuscript has complex contents. Scrivener labelled it as 564e.
It has marginalia.

Description 

The codex contains the text of the four Gospels, on 176 parchment leaves (size ), 
and two unfoliated modern paper flyleaves at the beginning and end.

The text is written in two columns per page, 27-29 lines per page. The manuscript has ornamented headpieces, the large initial letters in red, the small initials in red.

There is also another division according to the smaller Ammonian Sections (in Mark 237 Sections, the last section in 16:15), which numbers are given at the margin, but without a references to the Eusebian Canons.

It contains extracts from a commentary of Eulogius of Alexandria and diagnosis of Hesychius (folios 175-176).

Text 

The Greek text of the codex is a representative of the Byzantine text-type. Hermann von Soden classified it to Ak, related to the Byzantine commentated text (along with 534, 546, 558, 573). Kurt Aland placed it in Category V.

According to the Claremont Profile Method it represents textual family Kx in Luke 1 and Luke 10. In Luke 20 it has mixed Byzantine text.

 Textual variants
The word before the bracket is the reading of the UBS edition, the word after the bracket is the reading of the manuscript. The reading of Textus Receptus in bold.
 Mark 1:2 – καθως γεγραπται ] ως γεγραπται
 Mark 1:2 – εν τω Ησαια τω προφητη ] εν τοις προφεταις
 Mark 1:5 – παντες, και εβαπτιζοντο υπ αυτου εν τω Ιορδανη ποταμω ] και εβαπτιζοντο παντες εν τω Ιορδανη ποταμω υπ αυτου

History 

Scrivener dated the manuscript to the 13th century, Gregory dated it to the 13th or 14th century. Currently the manuscript is dated by the INTF to the 13th century.

Note in Greek on folio 2 with date 25 August 1720. James Woodhouse († 1866), Treasurer-General of the Ionian Islands. It was bought by Dean Burgon, then belonged to W. F. Rose, and bought for the British Museum in 1893 (along with minuscule 714, 716).

It was added to the list of New Testament manuscripts by Scrivener (564) and Gregory (715). Gregory saw the manuscript in 1883. The text was collated by Rose.

The manuscript is now housed at the British Library (Egerton MS 2785).

See also 

 List of New Testament minuscules
 Biblical manuscript
 Textual criticism

References

Further reading

External links 

 Minuscule 715 at the British Library

Greek New Testament minuscules
13th-century biblical manuscripts
Egerton collection